Uruguayan Australians refers to Australians of Uruguayan ancestry or birth who reside in Australia.

According to the 2006 Australian census, 9,376 Australians were born in Uruguay while 6,485 claimed Uruguayan ancestry, either alone or with another ancestry.

History 
The first migrants from Uruguay came to Australia in the 1960s with growing numbers in the 1970s due to military dictatorship.

Uruguayan Australians
 Alex Brosque, football (soccer) player for Sydney FC
 Anthony Cáceres, football player for Manchester City F.C.
 Nick Carle, football (soccer) player
 Richard Garcia, football (soccer) player for Perth Glory FC
 Telmo Languiller, politician
 Alex de Minaur, tennis player
 Richard Porta, football (soccer) player
 Blake Ricciuto, football player for Rockdale City Suns FC
 Carmen Novoa, Author, writer, painter, and poet.

External links

The Uruguay-born Community

See also 

 Argentine Australians
 Chilean Australians
 European Australians
 Europeans in Oceania
 Hispanic and Latin American Australians
 Immigration to Australia
 White Hispanics

References 

  
Latin American Australian
Australia